EasyEffects (formely known as PulseEffects) is a free and open-source GTK application for Unix-like systems which provides a large array of audio effects and filters to apply to input and output audio streams.

The application originally used the Pulseaudio sound server as it allowed effects to be added to audio streams with ease, however, now runs exclusively on the PipeWire sound server after a port in 2021.

It is published under the GPL-3.0-or-later license.

Overview 

EasyEffects uses PipeWire to process incoming and outgoing audio streams independently and can apply various sound effects in the form of plug-ins made by different developer teams such as Calf Studio Gear, MDA.LV2 and GStreamer. All plugins have their own presets and can be applicable inside the suite rather than having to use a different mixer or executing a script from the command line.

Available output effects are limiter, autovolume, compressor of dynamic range, filter, 30 bands parametric equalizer, bass enhancer, exciter, reverbation, crossfeed, delay, maximizer and spectrum analyzer. Available input effects are WebRTC, limiter, compressor, filter, equalizer, deeser, reverbation, pitch shift and spectrum analyzer.

References

External links 
 EasyEffects on GitHub

Audio software
Audio software for Linux
Audio software that uses GTK
Free audio software
Linux audio video-related software
Pitch modification software
Software that uses GStreamer
Software using the GPL license